Albert is a commune in the Somme department in Hauts-de-France in northern France.

It is located about halfway between Amiens and Bapaume.

History

Albert was founded as a Roman outpost, in about 54 BC. After being known by various forms of the name of the local river, the Ancre, it was renamed to Albert after it passed to Charles d'Albert, duc de Luynes. It was a key location in the Battle of the Somme in World War I, and World War I tourism is important for the town.

During World War I, the statue of Mary and the infant Jesus – designed by sculptor Albert Roze and dubbed the Golden Virgin – on top of the Basilica of Our Lady of Brebières was hit by a shell on 15 January 1915 and slumped to a near-horizontal position, where however it remained until further shelling in 1918 destroyed the tower.

In his letters home to his wife, Rupert Edward Inglis, who was a former rugby international and now a Forces Chaplain, described passing through Albert: "We went through the place today (2 October 1915) where the Virgin Statue at the top of the Church was hit by a shell in January. The statue was knocked over, but has never fallen, I sent you a picture of it. It really is a wonderful sight. It is incomprehensible how it can have stayed there, but I think it is now lower than when the photograph was taken, and no doubt will come down with the next gale. The Church and village are wrecked, there's a huge hole made by a Jack Johnson just outside the west door of the Church."

The German army recaptured the town in March 1918 during the Spring Offensive; the British, to prevent the Germans from using the church tower as a machine gun post, British troops bombarded and destroyed the basilica.  The statue fell in April 1918 and was never recovered.

Albert was completely reconstructed after the war, including widening and re-orienting the town's main streets. The Basilica, however, was faithfully rebuilt according to its original design by Eduoard Duthoit, the son of the architect who had overseen its construction in 1885–95. The present statue is an exact replica of Roze's original design, and a war memorial designed by Roze and featuring an image of the Leaning Virgin can be seen in the Abri (Shelter) Museum, which houses souvenirs of the war. The underground shelters in which the museum is located served as protective bunkers for Albert's residents during aerial bombardments in World War II.

The city appears in a short story, The Garden of Forking Paths, by the Argentine writer Jorge Luís Borges. In the story it is the location of a British artillery park that the Germans are about to bomb during World War I.

The Beaumont-Hamel Newfoundland Memorial is located only 9 kilometres from the village. It is a memorial site dedicated to Dominion of Newfoundland forces members who were killed during World War I. Officially opened by British Field Marshal Earl Haig in 1925, the memorial is one of only two National Historic Sites of Canada located outside of Canada.

Twin towns

Albert is twinned with the British town of Ulverston in Cumbria.

The two towns regularly meet to play football at Easter with the Cyril Barker Shield being contested every year. Albert and Ulverston alternate the match's venue.

Albert is also twinned with the German towns of Aldenhoven and Niesky. After the First World War, Albert was "adopted" by the English city of Birmingham, whose citizens funded a new almshouse building, and the main street is named Rue de Birmingham.

Population

Notable residents
The French operatic bass Xavier Depraz was born in Albert on 22 April 1926.

See also
Battle of Albert (disambiguation)
Communes of the Somme department
List of France's twin towns
Vendémiaire Pavot

References

External links

 Museum website
 Image of the Albert Basilica

Communes of Somme (department)
50s BC establishments
Populated places established in the 1st century BC
Picardy